Willdenowia is a small genus of flowering plants in the family Restionaceae described as a genus in 1790. The entire genus is endemic to the fynbos of the Western Cape Province of South Africa.

They are rhizomatous, tufted, dioecious perennials, generally with terete, branching stems (Restionaceae more often have simple stems). The leaf sheaths are convolute and persistent. The male flowers grow in numerous spikelets borne in panicled racemes subtended by caducous spathes. Each floret is subtended by a linear or setaceous caducous bract. There are six papery perianth segments, with the inner shorter than the outer. The anthers are oblong and apiculate and the ovaries are rudimentary.

The female spikelets may be single or several. They are borne in spicate cymes subtended by a persistent spathe. The perianth usually has six unequal segments clasping the sessile or stipitate ovary, which usually has a hard cap and a single locule. There are two styles, sometimes partly joined. The staminodes are ligulate. The fruit has pits or tubercles and is indehiscent.

 Species

 Formerly included
moved to other genera: Anthochortus Cannomois Ceratocaryum Chrysitrix Hypodiscus Restio

References

Restionaceae
Endemic flora of South Africa
Flora of the Cape Provinces
Fynbos
Poales genera